The East Turkestan Liberation Organization (ETLO) was a secessionist Uyghur organization that advocated for an independent Uyghur state named East Turkestan in the Western Chinese province known as Xinjiang. The organization was established in Turkey in 1990 or 1996 to fight against the Chinese government in Xinjiang, a territory of ethnic Uyghur majority. ETLO is a designated terrorist organization by the governments of China, Kazakhstan, and Kyrgyzstan.

History
Amnesty International reports that "The Chinese government’s use of the term "separatism" refers to a broad range of activities, many of which amount to no more than peaceful opposition or dissent. Over the last three years, tens of thousands of people are reported to have been detained for investigation in the region and hundreds, possibly thousands, have been charged or sentenced under the Criminal Law; many Uighurs are believed to have been sentenced to death and executed for alleged "separatist" or "terrorist" offenses, although the exact number is impossible to determine."

In 1998, ETLO members were accused by the government of China of organizing 15 arson incidents in Ürümqi, and in 1999, Istanbul police arrested 10 ETLO members for a series of attacks on Chinese people in Turkey.

Since 9/11, 2001, China has effectively used the international climate to build an international coalition against Uyghur separatist movements. On 15 December 2003, the Chinese Ministry of Public Security issued a list of East Turkestan terrorists and terrorist organizations which named four organizations and several individuals: the East Turkestan Liberation Organization (ETLO), the East Turkestan Islamic Movement (ETIM), the World Uyghur Youth Congress (WUYC), and the East Turkestan Information Center (ETIC). Many analysts claim that Russian and Chinese authorities exaggerate the potency of the Uyghur groups to justify their repressive counter-terror policies.

In a 2002 Chinese documentary, "On the Spot Report: The Crimes of Eastern Turkestan Terrorist Power," Wang Mingshan, Deputy Director-General of the Yili-Kazak Autonomous Prefecture Public Security Department, claimed that in 1998 Mehmet Emin Hazret, the leader of the ETLO, ordered Hamid Mehmetjan, an Egyptian ETLO member, to go to China to recruit members, receive a delivery of weapons on 6 April, and to compile a list of targets for assassination and bombings in Xinjiang. Mingshan also claimed that police and ETLO members exchanged gunfire on 24 April 1998, and that members later stated during interrogation that they were trained at camps in Afghanistan.

On 15 December 2003, the Chinese Ministry of Public Security issued a list of East Turkestan terrorists and terrorist organizations which named four organizations and several individuals: the East Turkestan Liberation Organization (ETLO), the East Turkestan Islamic Movement (ETIM), the World Uyghur Youth Congress (WUYC) and the East Turkestan Information Centre (ETIC).
At the same time, the official Chinese press initiated a campaign detailing terrorist incidents allegedly carried out by the individuals listed. Amnesty International regarded these allegations "uncorroborated and no credible evidence was provided to substantiate these claims. Indeed, much of the "evidence" appeared to have been obtained from other individuals under interrogation. In view of the ongoing and widespread use of torture and ill-treatment by police in China, particularly to extract confessions from detained suspects, Amnesty International believes any "evidence" obtained in this way must be treated with deep suspicion." In January, Hazret, who avoids public appearances, called into Radio Free Asia to respond that ETLO wishes to work by peaceful means, but spoke of the "inevitability" of a military wing targeting the Chinese government. He also stated that the principal goal of the ETLO was to pursue independence through peaceful means, and denied any participation in terrorist activities or connections to the East Turkestan Islamic Movement.
Amnesty International has criticized the Chinese government response to ETLO, which it says include human rights violations, such as torture and ill-treatment by police.

Designation as a terrorist organization
The Shanghai Cooperation Organisation (SCO) members of China, Kazakhstan, and Kyrgyzstan, respectively, have designated ETLO as a terrorist organization. According to Amnesty International, the listing of ETIM and ETLO was in keeping with previous allegations made by China against these groups. Both were highlighted in China's official report on East Turkestan terrorists of January 2002 and China's allegations against ETIM (East Turkestan Islamic Movement) were bolstered in August 2002 when the U.S., closely followed by the UN formally classified ETIM as a terrorist organization after several requests from China. In November 2020, the United States removed the ETIM from its terrorist organisations list. The group was previously designated as a foreign terrorist organisation by the U.S. in 2002, in the wake of the September 11 attacks in the U.S.. In response, China accused U.S. of double standard. The relations between the two countries has deteriorated since 2017 under President Donald Trump whose administration labeled China a strategic competitor.

The organization operates primarily in Xinjiang, China, but operates throughout Central Asia and in Pakistan. The ETLO is allied with the East Turkestan Islamic Movement and the Taliban. Kazakhstan banned the ETLO, designating it a terrorist organization, on 17 November 2006. The United States State Department says the ETLO has engaged "small motivated bombings and armed attacks". The Global Defense Review writes that it is "widely acknowledged" that Al-Qaeda gives funding and training to the ETLO and the East Turkestan Islamic Movement.

See also
 East Turkestan independence movement
 East Turkestan Islamic Movement
 2008 Uyghur unrest

References

East Turkestan independence movement
Defunct organizations designated as terrorist in Asia
Rebel groups in China
Anti-communist terrorism
Secessionist organizations in Asia
Terrorism in Kazakhstan
Islamic terrorism in Kazakhstan
Military units and formations established in 2000
2003 disestablishments in China
Organizations designated as terrorist by China
Organizations designated as terrorist by Kyrgyzstan
Separatism in China